Apocryphon ("secret writing"), plural apocrypha, was a Greek term for a genre of Jewish and Early Christian writings that were meant to impart "secret teachings" or gnosis (knowledge) that could not be publicly taught. Jesus briefly withheld his messianic identity from the public. Based on that fact, some hypothesize without support that he also gave private instruction to the apostles, figures in the canonical Gospels of the New Testament and furnishes the material of the "sayings" Gospel of Thomas and part of the material of the Gospel of Mary. It is purportedly a secret teaching supposedly committed to a trusted disciple by Christ after his resurrection. The secret teaching in Gnostic literature refers to several things.

Examples  include:
Genesis Apocryphon, from the Qumran caves
Secret Gospel of Mark (Apocryphon of Mark)
Apocryphon of James (Secret Book of James), in the Nag Hammadi library
Apocryphon of John (Secret Book of John), in the Nag Hammadi library
Apocryphon of Ezekiel (Secret Book of Ezekiel)
Apocryphon of the Ten Tribes

See also 
 Biblical apocrypha
 Jewish apocrypha
 New Testament apocrypha
 Nag Hammadi library
 List of Mandaean scriptures

References

Apocrypha